Femoroacetabular impingement (FAI) is a condition involving one or more anatomical abnormalities of the hip joint, which is a ball and socket joint. It is a common cause of hip pain and discomfort in young and middle-aged adults. It occurs when the ball shaped femoral head contacts the acetabulum abnormally or does not permit a normal range of motion in the acetabular socket. Damage can occur to the articular cartilage, or labral cartilage (soft tissue, ring-shaped bumper of the socket), or both. The condition may be symptomatic or asymptomatic. It may cause osteoarthritis of the hip. Treatment options range from conservative management to surgery.

Signs and symptoms 
Pain is the most common complaint in those with FAI. It is experienced in a number of areas, making the diagnosis challenging, but commonly occurs in the groin, upper buttock/lower back, the buttock or beneath the buttock, side of the affected hip and posterior upper leg. Onset of symptoms has been reported to present in both an acute and more gradual manner.  The pain is often significant enough to cause a decrease in activity level and movement. Some will also describe decreased range of motion of the affected hip. Another symptom is groin pain associated with activity and no prior history of trauma. Inability to perform activities such as high hip flexion or prolong sitting can also be seen in individuals with FAI.

Cause

FAI is characterized by abnormal contact between the proximal femur and rim of the acetabulum (hip socket). In most cases, patients present with a deformity in the femoral head, or acetabulum, a poorly positioned femoral-acetabular junction, or any or all of the foregoing. The cause of FAI is currently unknown, but both congenital and acquired etiologies have been put forth. Studies have shown an increased incidence in siblings, suggesting a genetic component. At least one study has also shown a predilection in the white population. It has also been reported to be more common in males. However, there is no concrete evidence to suggest a genetic trait and instead, the most favored theory currently supports that FAI (the cam type in particular) is due to repetitive movements involving the hip (e.g. squatting) in young athletes. Aggravating activities that are commonly reported include repetitive or prolonged squatting, twisting movements of the hip, like pivoting during athletics, getting in and out of cars, and even sitting for prolonged periods. A combination of these factors may also predispose to a form of FAI; predominantly, a marginal developmental hip abnormality together with environmental factors such as recurrent motion of the legs within a supraphysiologic range.

Three types of FAI are recognized (see title image). The first involves an excess of bone along the upper surface of the femoral head, known as a cam deformity (abbreviation for camshaft, which the shape of the femoral head and neck resembles). The second is due to an excess of growth of the upper lip of the acetabular cup and is known as a 'pincer' deformity.  The third is a combination of the two, generally referred to as 'mixed.' The most common type seen, approximately 70% of the time, is the mixed type. A complicating issue is that some of the radiographic findings of FAI have also been described in asymptomatic subjects.

Current literature suggests that the cam type of impingement is associated with the development of hip osteoarthritis. Thus far, no correlation has been seen between the pincer type and development of hip osteoarthritis.

Anatomy 
The hip joint is classified as a ball and socket joint. This type of synovial joint allows for multidirectional movement and rotation. There are two bones that make up the hip joint and create an articulation between the femur and pelvis. This articulation connects the axial skeleton with the lower extremity. The pelvic bone, also known as the innominate bone, is formed by three bones fused together: the ilium, ischium, and pubis. The musculature of the hip is divided into anterior hip muscles and posterior hip muscles. The major nerve supply that runs through the hip joint is the femoral nerve and the sciatic nerve.

Diagnosis
Clinical evaluation is the first step in diagnosis, but will rarely lead to the diagnosis on its own, due to inconsistent and vague nature of the pain. Childhood and current activity should be inquired about. Physical exam should also involve assessing passive internal rotation of the hip during flexion, as range of motion is reduced in proportion to the size of a cam lesion. Flexing the hip to 90 degrees, adducting, and internally rotating the hip, known as the FADDIR test, should also be performed. It is positive when it causes pain. The FABER test should also be performed, this test involves flexing, abducting, and externally rotating the hip. The FABER test is useful when diagnosing concurrently with a labral pathology and is considered positive if the position elicits pain. Additional non-invasive ways to observe possible FAI is changes in gait that include a lower peak hip extension and internal rotation to compensate for bony growth.

X-ray

Projectional radiography ("X-ray")is often considered first line for FAI. Anterior-posterior pelvis and a lateral image of the hip in question should be attained. A 45-degree Dunn view is also recommended.

Other modalities
MRI imaging may follow, particularly if there is no specific evidence on radiographs, producing a three-dimensional reconstruction of the joint for better definition, to evaluate the hip cartilage, or measure hip socket angles (e.g. the alpha-angle as described by Nötzli in 2-D and by Siebenrock in 3-D). MR arthrogram had been used in the past, as it was more sensitive for picking up soft tissue lesions; however, due to improvement in technology, MRI is now considered comparable for picking up such lesions. CT is not usually used due to radiation exposure and no benefit above MRI. It is possible to perform dynamic simulation of hip motion with CT or MRI assisting to establish whether, where, and to what extent, impingement is occurring.

The diagnosis is often made in conjunction with a labral tear.

Differential Diagnosis 
 Piriformis syndrome or strain
 Labral tear without FAI
 Adductor muscle strain
 Sciatica
 Athletic pubalgia
 Gluteus medius/minimus or illiopsoas tendinopathy
 Stress fracture
 Femoral head osteonecrosis
 Other impingements, including anterior inferior iliac spine, ischiofemoral and iliopsoas
 Loose body in the joint (intra-articular body)

Prevention 
Prevention is currently being investigated. The goal of prevention would be to avoid joint damage and premature hip osteoarthritis. Studies are examining the effectiveness of screening adolescents in school and targeting at-risk individuals for education, physical therapy and decreasing participation in possibly harmful activities/sports as referenced in the epidemiology section.

Treatment
Treatment of FAI can be divided into those that are non-operative (conservative) and operative. Conservative treatment is often prescribed for those who have not yet received any therapy. Conservative treatment includes physical therapy, avoidance of those activities that produce pain, and  nonsteroidal anti-inflammatory drugs. It may also include joint injections with cortisone or hyaluronic acid, particularly for those who wish to avoid surgery.

Physical therapy is implemented for the purpose of improving joint mobility, strengthening muscles surrounding the joint, correcting posture, and treating any other muscle or joint deficits that may be exacerbating the condition. A movement analysis may also be performed to identify specific movement patterns that may be causing injury. Studies to demonstrate the effectiveness of physical therapy are currently underway, with no conclusive results to date.

Operative treatment is generally recommended to those who continue to have symptoms. It involves the surgical correction of any bony abnormalities causing the impingement and correction of any soft tissue lesions, such as labral tears. The primary aim of surgery is to correct the fit of the femoral head and acetabulum to create a hip socket that reduces contact between the two, allowing a greater range of movement. This includes femoral head sculpting and/or trimming of the acetabular rim.

Surgery may be arthroscopic or open. A 2011 study analyzing current surgical methods for management of symptomatic femoral acetabular impingement, suggested that the arthroscopic method had surgical outcomes equal to or better than other methods with a lower rate of major complications when performed by experienced surgeons; consequently, the surgery is now rarely done open.

Outcomes of arthroscopic surgery are currently being studied, but have generally been positive. According to a 2019 meta-analysis, the risk of having surgery fail or need to be re-operated on is about 5.5% whereas the complication rate is 1.7%. Additionally, patient reported outcomes show that approximately three to six months post-operative hip arthroscopy is when pain reduction and activities of daily life are improved. For sport function this timeline is about six months to a year. Failure of hip arthroscopy is more likely to fail in older patients, females, or those who have experienced the symptoms of FAI for a long period of time.

When performed on elite athletes, most are able to return their previous level of competition. These athletes also have a higher rate of return to sport than recreational and collegiate athletes.

Long term, randomized controlled trials evaluating the efficacy of conservative and operative treatments are underway.

Epidemiology 
There has been limited research on the prevalence of FAI among a general population according to a literature review by Algarni. On the other hand, there are many sources that discuss the prevalence of athletes with the condition especially those that are younger and white. Hockey, tennis, soccer, and equestrian are all sports where the prevalence of a femoral neck abnormalities are higher due to the nature of the sport to force athletes into forced, loaded flexion and internal rotation.

Cam lesions are more common in males, where pincer lesions are more common in females due to differences in anatomical development of the pelvis.

History 
FAI is a relatively recent discovery. Its original description is credited to orthopedic surgeon Dr. Reinhold Ganz, who first proposed the condition as a cause for hip osteoarthritis in a publication in 2003.

While the true diagnosis of FAI can be considered a relatively recent discovery, reports of damage to the femoroaceatabular region date back over a century ago in the orthopedic realm of medicine. It was not until the development of an open surgical dislocation procedure was developed that FAI was discovered as an anatomical difference and cause of osteoarthritis. Orthopedic surgeon Dr. Reinhold Ganz can be credited with this discovery in his 2003 publication that discussed the findings and relation to hip osteoarthritis.

Society

Notable persons who have had hip impingement:
 Zach Banner (born 1993), American NFL football offensive tackle for the Pittsburgh Steelers
 Michelle Kwan, American figure skater
 Oscar Hiljemark, Swedish footballer
 Greg Holland, American baseball player
 Devin Mesoraco, American baseball player
 Charlie Morton, American baseball player
 Andy Murray, British tennis player
 Greg Norman, Australian golfer
 Alex Rodriguez, American baseball player
 Isaiah Thomas, American basketball player

Notes

References

Further reading

External links 
 Femoroacetabular Impingement (FAI) on OrthoInfo
 IMPAKT-HiP (Investigations of Mobility, Physical Activity, and Knowledge in Hip Pain) Study by the Arthritis Research Centre of Canada 

Skeletal disorders
Rheumatology
Articles containing video clips